is a Japanese manga artist. He is best known for writing the long-running shōnen manga series Kōtarō Makaritōru! and its two sequels, Shin Kōtarō Makaritōru! and Kōtarō Makaritōru! L. In 1986, he won the Kodansha Manga Award for shōnen for Kōtarō Makaritōru!.

References

External links 
 
 Profile at The Ultimate Manga Guide

Living people
Manga artists from Fukushima Prefecture
Winner of Kodansha Manga Award (Shōnen)
Year of birth missing (living people)